This is a list of members of the Tasmanian Legislative Council between 1999 and 2005. Terms of the Legislative Council did not coincide with Legislative Assembly elections, and members served six year terms, with a number of members facing election each year.

A major redistribution prior to the 1999 periodic election reduced the Council from 19 to 15 seats.

Elections

Members

Sources
 Parliament of Tasmania (2006). The Parliament of Tasmania from 1856

Members of Tasmanian parliaments by term
21st-century Australian politicians
20th-century Australian politicians